Lucasium alboguttatum, sometimes called the white-spotted ground gecko, is a gecko endemic to Australia.

References

Lucasium
Reptiles described in 1910
Taxa named by Franz Werner
Geckos of Australia